Jayden Short (born 24 January 1996) is an Australian rules footballer currently playing for the Richmond Football Club in the Australian Football League (AFL). He was a premiership player with Richmond in 2019 and 2020, and in 2020 won the club's best and fairest award, the Jack Dyer Medal. He is best known for his efficient, penetrating kicks off half back and his excellent work rates.

Early life and junior football
Short spent his formative years in Mill Park, a suburb 19 kilometres north-east of Melbourne. He played representative junior football with the Northern Knights in the TAC Cup in 2013 while completing his last year of high school at St Monica's College. Short returned to the Knights in 2014, playing while also working as a carpenter. He missed the first two months of that season due to jaw injury sustained in a night club fight but completed 2014 having played 13 matches, kicking 12 goals and holding averages of 22 disposals and four tackles per game. He was named among his club's best players in eight of his 13 matches. Short was ranked the best kick in the TAC Cup that year, recording an efficiency of 73.7 per cent by foot across his matches in 2014.

He supported the Carlton Football Club growing up and idolised Anthony Koutoufides.

Prior to the AFL draft, Short was interviewed in his home by Richmond, Collingwood and Hawthorn.

AFL career

2015 season
After being passed over by all 18 clubs in the national draft, Short was drafted by Richmond with the 11th overall selection in the 2015 rookie draft.

He went unselected for an AFL debut when the season began, and instead played reserves-grade matches with the club's Victorian Football League side. Short played primarily as a forward and occasionally as a stoppage-attending half-forward during this time, regularly kicking goals and receiving the coaches' public praise for his efforts with ball in hand, but copping criticism for his defensive efforts and subpar application of forward-half pressure. He produced a standout three-goal performance in late June, before suffering a season-ending ankle injury in a match against the Northern Bullants the following week. He had failed to make an AFL debut that year, but had played 10 VFL matches with averages of 13 disposals per game.

2016 season
In March 2016 Short was upgraded to Richmond's senior list, replacing the injured Reece Conca. He made his debut in round 2 of that season and kicked a goal with his first kick in league football. Short finished the game with an equal team-high three goals. In that match he also suffered a minor shoulder injury, but opted not to treat it with reparative surgery. He followed the match up with a poor performance the following week and was subsequently dropped to the club's reserves side. When he returned to the senior side in round 7 he played significant game-time as a small defender, having been trialed in the role in VFL matches the previous month. He remained in the side for three weeks before being dropped for matches in round 10 and 11. He finished his debut season having played 16 matches, playing predominantly in the backline and becoming a key kick-out taker for the side. At season's end he was upgraded to the Richmond's senior playing list and switched guernsey numbers from 45 to 15.

2017 season

Short's first senior match in 2017 came in Richmond's round 2 victory against Collingwood. He recorded a game-high 634 metres gained in that match. Short found himself in a similar situation in round 10 when he was ruled to have deliberately rushed a behind while being chased to the goal line by 's Josh Green. It was a decision that sparked media discussion over a possible future change to the rules. After all teams had completed their bye in round 13, Short ranked third in the AFL for metres gained per disposal (25.3). By round 15 he was averaging 276 metres gained per match. Over the next three weeks he became the club's prime rebounding defender as a result of a four week suspension being served by teammate Bachar Houli. Round 18 saw Short significantly underperform, recording no rebound 50s and less than 10 total disposals for the first time that year. He was dropped the following week and did not return to senior football in 2017. Short's year did not end there however, as he joined Richmond's reserves side in their VFL finals run. This period included playing in three winning finals and in the club's losing grand final against Port Melbourne. The following week he was named as an emergency, but did not play, in Richmond's AFL Grand Final team. Short finished the season having played 16 matches at AFL level.

2018 season

In the 2017/18 off-season, Short underwent shoulder surgery to repair the troublesome joint that had sustained minor injury in his first AFL match two years earlier. His experience during the procedure and in the early stages of recovery was recorded and later revealed in a documentary short film commissioned by the AFL Players Association entitled The Surgery. Though he would return to conditioning work within a month, the recovery process kept him from participating in contact drills into the start of the 2018 calendar year. Short spent that off-season training with the midfield group, with an eye to playing a dual role of half-back and wing in the coming season. Short returned to full fitness in time to play for Richmond's side at the Sydney AFLX tournament in February, before playing in each of the club's two pre-season matches. In round 1 he re-joined the club's best-22 after premiership defenders Bachar Houli and Nathan Broad missed due to injury and suspension respectively. Short impressed, holding a spot in the side even after Houli and Broad's return to availability. In round 6 he received a vote in the AFL Coaches Association Player of the Year award after recording 20 disposals, eight intercepts and a game-high eight rebound-50s. To that point he ranked second at the club and 30th in the league for kicking efficiency (75.3 per cent) He also placed second at Richmond and behind only Dustin Martin for total metres gained in the first six matches of the year. Two weeks later he would post a then-career-high 28 disposals in the Dreamtime at the 'G match against . After that match coach Damien Hardwick flagged Short as "one of the most improved players in the competition" for his jump that season. After 13 rounds of the season Short ranked third in the league for total metres gained and ninth for rebound 50s. He was at that point labelled by AFL Media as Richmond's most improved player, with the media organisation also predicting he would be running fifth in the club's best and fairest count at that stage of the season. Following that match he was ranked second in the league for metres gained. By the end of that round Short had taken the number one rank in the league for metres gained, averaging 526 per match. He remained in form at AFL level through the end of the regular season and into the club's home qualifying final against , where he recorded 21 disposals. At season's end he was named at half-back in the AFL's 2018 Player Ratings seconds team. Short was also named at half-back in the AFL Players Association's 22 under 22 team and placed ninth in the Richmond best and fairest count. He finished the year having ranked first in the league for metres gained and 10th for rebound 50s. Short's performances in 2018 led him to be labelled by numerous media outlets as one of the most improved players in the league that year, including AFL.com.au who named him second by that measure and labelled him an unlucky omission from that year's All-Australian squad.

2019 season

Ahead of the 2019 season, Short was named by Fox Footy as the Richmond player most likely to make a significant rise in output that year. He started the 2019 campaign with appearances in each of the club's two pre-season matches before recording 20 disposals in round 1's season-opening match against . Initial estimations from the club said Short would miss at least eight weeks of football as he recovered from the injury. By mid-May that schedule had been extended, with Short out of his elbow brace and beginning to rehabilitate the elbow with an eye to a return post-bye. He resumed running in mid June, on track for that revised return target. After completing contact training drills and match practice during the bye, Short earned a selection re-call for round 15's match against . He recorded 22 disposals, 706 metres gained and a game-high six rebound 50s in the 33-point victory. That earned his side a home preliminary final against , where Short added a further 13 disposals to help his side through to a grand final match-up against . In the grand final, Short was part of a Richmond defence that kept the Giants to 25 points, their lowest score in the club's eight year history and the lowest score by any team in a VFL/AFL grand final since 1960. He recorded 19 disposals and seven marks in what was described by AFL Media as a "polished" performance. Short finished the year having become a premiership player after playing 15 matches in that injury-interrupted season.

2020 season
He recorded 15 disposals in a round 1 win over Carlton when the season began in late March, but under extraordinary conditions imposed on the league as a result of the rapid progression of the coronavirus pandemic into Australia. In what the league planned would be the first of a reduced 17-round season, the match was played without crowds in attendance due to public health prohibitions on large gatherings and with quarter lengths reduced by one fifth in order to reduce the physical load on players who would be expected to play multiple matches with short breaks in the second half of the year. Just three days later, the AFL Commission suspended the season for an indefinite period after multiple states enforced quarantine conditions on their borders that effectively ruled out the possibility of continuing the season as planned. After an 11-week hiatus, Short contributed 14 disposals in a round 2 draw with  when the season resumed in early-June. He remained a steady contributor in June, before the club was relocated to the Gold Coast in response to a virus outbreak in Melbourne in early July. He was equal-second-best on ground against the  two weeks later, receiving four votes for another territory game that included 511 metres gained, before rising one week later to be first among all players in the league that year for total metres gained (460.1m). Short placed second behind only Dustin Martin in the Norm Smith Medal votes for best afield, for that performance which also included a personal season-best 25 disposals. He bested Martin in the club's best and fairest count though, securing the Jack Dyer Medal as the club's most outstanding player in 2020 after playing in all 21 possible matches and recording a league-best average of 480 metres gained per match.

Player profile
Short plays as a rebounding half-back, utilising exceptional long kicking skills on either foot to set up offensive chains of possession. He previously played as a small forward in his very early AFL matches.

Following a best and fairest winning year, Short was named the ninth best defender and 28th best player overall in the Herald Sun's list of the best players from the 2020 season.

Statistics
Updated to the end of the 2022 season.

|-
| 2015 ||  || 45
| 0 || — || — || — || — || — || — || — || — || — || — || — || — || — || — || —
|-
| 2016 ||  || 45
| 16 || 6 || 3 || 189 || 49 || 238 || 54 || 30 || 0.4 || 0.2 || 11.8 || 3.1 || 14.9 || 3.4 || 1.9 || 0
|-
| 2017 ||  || 15
| 16 || 2 || 1 || 190 || 46 || 236 || 61 || 21 || 0.1 || 0.1 || 11.9 || 2.9 || 14.8 || 3.8 || 1.3 || 0
|-
| 2018 ||  || 15
| 24 || 9 || 8 || 360 || 120 || 480 || 102 || 39 || 0.4 || 0.3 || 15.0 || 5.0 || 20.0 || 4.3 || 1.6 || 1
|-
| scope=row bgcolor=F0E68C | 2019# || 
| 15 || 15 || 3 || 1 || 197 || 68 || 265 || 66 || 26 || 0.2 || 0.1 || 13.1 || 4.5 || 17.7 || 4.4 || 1.7 || 0
|-
| scope=row bgcolor=F0E68C | 2020# || 
| 15 || 21 || 0 || 4 || bgcolor=CAE1FF | 297†  || 103 || 400 || 114 || 27 || 0.0 || 0.2 || 14.1 || 4.9 || 19.0 || 5.4 || 1.3 || 3
|-
| 2021 ||  || 15
| 22 || 1 || 2 || 411 || 131 || 542 || 134 || 39 || 0.0 || 0.1 || 18.7 || 5.9 || 24.6 || 6.1 || 1.8 || 0
|-
| 2022 ||  || 15
| 23 || 6 || 4 || bgcolor=CAE1FF | 444† || 115 || 559 || 127 || 67 || 0.3 || 0.2 || 19.3 || 5.0 || 24.3 || 5.5 || 2.9 || 6
|- class="sortbottom"
! colspan=3| Career
! 137
! 27
! 23
! 2088
! 632
! 2720
! 658
! 249
! 0.2
! 0.2
! 15.2
! 4.6
! 19.9
! 4.8
! 1.8
! 10
|}

Notes

Honours and achievements
Team
 AFL Premiership: 2019, 2020
 McClelland Trophy: 2018

Individual
Jack Dyer Medal RFC B&F: 2020
22under22 team: 2018

Personal life
Outside of football Short studies courses in carpentry, building and construction. He previously worked as a builder's labourer as a seventeen year old while playing for the Northern Knights.

References

External links

 
 
 Jayden Short's statistics from Footy Wire
 The Surgery — Featuring Jayden Short on YouTube

Living people
1996 births
Northern Knights players
Australian rules footballers from Victoria (Australia)
Richmond Football Club players
Richmond Football Club Premiership players
Two-time VFL/AFL Premiership players